In baseball, a lead or lead off is the short distance that a player stands away from their current base.

On the bases 
In baseball, to lead off, or to take a lead, refers to the position a baserunner takes just prior to a pitch, a short distance away from the base the player occupies.  A "lead" can also refer to that distance.  A typical lead is six to ten feet (two to three meters) from the base.  If the lead is too large, the runner risks being picked off.  If the lead is too small, the runner has a disadvantage in reaching the next base, whether in a stolen base attempt or in connection with the next batted ball.

See also 
"Backing up", the cricket equivalent

Batting (baseball)
Baseball positions
Baseball terminology